The 2017 UAB Blazers football team represented the University of Alabama at Birmingham (UAB) in the 2017 NCAA Division I FBS football season as a member of the West Division of Conference USA (C-USA). They were led by second-year head coach Bill Clark and played their home games at Legion Field in Birmingham, Alabama. They finished the season 8–5, 6–2 in C-USA play to finish in a tie for second place in the West Division. They received an invitation to the Bahamas Bowl, where they lost to Ohio.

The 2017 season marked the return of UAB football after a two-year hiatus following the elimination of the program in December 2014 and its subsequent reinstatement in July 2015.

Previous season 
The Blazers last participated in a football season in 2014. The Blazers finished the season 6–6, 4–4 C-USA play to finish in a tie for third place in the West Division. Following the season, the school stopped sponsoring football. However on June 1, 2015, the school announced they were beginning the process to reinstate football, and the program was reinstated for the 2017 season.

Spring Game
The 2017 Spring Game took place at Legion Field, on April 1, at 1:00 p.m., and the Green team, composed of starters, defeated the Gold team 49–7 before 7,822 fans.

Schedule

Game summaries

Alabama A&M

at Ball State

Coastal Carolina

at North Texas

Louisiana Tech

Middle Tennessee

at Charlotte

at Southern Miss

Rice

at UTSA

at Florida

UTEP

vs. Ohio–Bahamas Bowl

References

UAB
UAB Blazers football seasons
UAB Blazers football